Camocim is a municipality in the state of Ceará, Brazil, founded in 1879.

References

External links 

Populated coastal places in Ceará
Municipalities in Ceará